Agkonia is a genus of moths in the subfamily Arctiinae. The genus was erected by Paul Dognin in 1894.

Species
 Agkonia miranda Hampson, 1900
 Agkonia ovifera Dognin, 1906
 Agkonia pega Dognin, 1894

References

Lithosiini
Moth genera